Hyllisia rufipes is a species of beetle in the family Cerambycidae. It was described by Pic in 1934.

References

rufipes
Beetles described in 1934
Taxa named by Maurice Pic